Deo Barunark or Deo (देवबरनार्क) is a village dating back to the Maurya period. It is a large village in the Tarari block of Bhojpur district, Bihar, India. The village has a total of 735 families.

History
An inscription was found here in the 19th century dating to the time of Jivitagupta II. This is a valuable source of information for the later Guptas, naming king Jivitagupta as the son of Vishnugupta and his queen Ijjadevi. There is an ancient Sun temple in the village which received land grants from the Gupta and Maukhari rulers. The location was photographed by Henry Baily Wade Garrick in 1881–82.

Administration
Deo village is administrated by Mukhiya through its Gram Panchayat, who is elected representative of village as per constitution of India and Panchyati Raj Act.

References

Villages in Bhojpur district, India

बिहार का ऐतिहासिक देववरूणार्क सूर्यमंदिर बदहाल स्थिति में